William Giles Jones (November 7, 1808 – April 1, 1883) was a United States district judge of the United States District Court for the Middle District of Alabama, the United States District Court for the Northern District of Alabama and the United States District Court for the Southern District of Alabama.

Education and career

Born in Powhatan County, Virginia, Jones attended Hampden–Sydney College and the University of Virginia before reading law to enter the bar in 1830. He was in private practice in Virginia from 1830 to 1834, then worked as a clerk in the United States Land Office in Demopolis, Alabama, resuming his private practice in West Greene and Eutaw, Alabama from 1836 to 1843. He was a member of the Alabama House of Representatives in 1843, thereafter relocating his private practice to Mobile, Alabama from 1843 to 1860. He again served in the Alabama House of Representatives in 1849 and in 1857.

Federal judicial service

Jones received a recess appointment from President James Buchanan on September 29, 1859, to a joint seat on the United States District Court for the Middle District of Alabama, the United States District Court for the Northern District of Alabama and the United States District Court for the Southern District of Alabama vacated by Judge John Gayle. He was nominated to the same position by President Buchanan on January 23, 1860. He was confirmed by the United States Senate on January 30, 1860, and received his commission the same day. His service terminated on January 12, 1861, due to his resignation.

Later career and death

Following his resignation from the federal bench, Jones served as a Judge of the Confederate District Court for the District of Alabama from 1861 to 1865. He returned to private practice in Mobile from 1866 to 1883. He died on April 1, 1883, in Mobile.

References

Sources
 

1808 births
1883 deaths
People from Powhatan County, Virginia
Members of the Alabama House of Representatives
Judges of the United States District Court for the Southern District of Alabama
Judges of the United States District Court for the Northern District of Alabama
Judges of the United States District Court for the Middle District of Alabama
United States federal judges appointed by James Buchanan
19th-century American judges
Judges of the Confederate States of America
Hampden–Sydney College alumni
University of Virginia alumni
United States federal judges admitted to the practice of law by reading law
Politicians from Mobile, Alabama
Lawyers from Mobile, Alabama
19th-century American politicians